Koh Rong is the second largest island of Cambodia.  The word Rong might refer to an old term for "cave" or "tunnel", although some islanders say Rong refers to a historical person's name.  It can also refer to the Old Khmer word for shelter, adding up to Shelter Island.

Four village communities exist on the island: Koh Tuich, Doeum D'keuw, Prek Svay and Sok San. In recent years the island has become home to an increasing but still moderate number of foreign-run guesthouses and bungalow resorts. As the island's South-Eastern tip around Koh Tuich Village is the point of arrival it has developed into the island's largest settlement center. In absence of even the most basic infrastructure, transport by boat is required to all settlements and holiday resorts, which are scattered over the many beaches.

Koh Rong island is a relatively new commune, only established in 2000. In order to boost development, Koh Rong has had a land concession issued by the Cambodian government. A Cambodian consortium, the Royal Group has been granted a 99-year lease. In 2008 it revealed plans to build "Asia's first environmentally planned resort island."

In January 2019, a government sub-decree established a new city from Koh Rong and Koh Rong Sanloem.

Geography 
Koh Rong is the biggest of the islands off the coast of Sihanoukville in the Gulf of Thailand. The terrain is predominantly hilly with a sizable mountain  at the island’s north-west. The hills provide water for countless creeks and estuaries. The island’s interior is almost completely forested, concealing a number of seasonal waterfalls. There are no less than 23 beaches of varying length and coloration—from (predominantly) white to beige to rose-colored sands—along most of the coastline. Bays, protruding capes and impressive sandstone rock formations contribute to the island's scenic panorama. The southern coastline, exposed to the weather and open sea, is particularly spectacular, whereas the eastern coast, which faces towards the land, is characterized by a sequence of smooth hills, gently sloping towards the numerous crescent-shaped beaches, inlets and bays. Several small islets and many reefs provide an abundance of natural environments for a great variety of marine life. The center of the island is a flat "belt" of sediments that joins the two hilly massifs of the south-east and north-west. Here is a small savanna—the result of human activities and cultivation.

Although most of the island's surface is still covered in forest, many years of illegal logging have seriously affected the quality and health of the jungle. Huge, old and slow-growing hardwood trees have become rare, the original arboreal variety is vanishing and gradually being replaced by commercial mono cultures, such as coco and oil palms, in particular along the coast and in the lowlands.

Tiny Koh Tuich island lies off the south-east and the twin islands of Koh Bong-Po'own or Koh Song-Saa lie off the north-east of Koh Rong. To its south lies the uninhabited island of Koh Koun, followed by Koh Rong Sanloem island. These five islands comprise the Sangkat Koh Rong or Commune 5 of Mittakpheap District.

History 

The island was governed by the Navy authority for five miles around the island during 1979 to 2000. Since 2000 the Department of Fisheries is the principal government agency responsible for management of living aquatic resources. It cooperates with local authorities, communities, local fishers, and NGOs, to manage and conserve the resources.

Henri Mouhot on his way from Bangkok to Kampot, a day and a half before arrival, in Travels in the Central Parts of Indo-China, 1864:

Settlements and infrastructure 

There are four distinguishable villages on Koh Rong—Koh Tuich Village in the south-east, Prek Svay in the north-east, Daem Thkov (Sangkat Village) in the east, and Sok San Village in the west. Most local residents live from fishing (70%) and small scale crop cultivation (30%), although an increasing number has found jobs in the quickly growing tourism sector. This is particularly true for Koh Tuich Village, where tourist businesses currently outnumber residential homes.

Apart from narrow paths in the jungle—many of these are dead ends that had been created by illegal loggers—there exists absolutely no road network. The island's interior remains non-populated, villages and holiday resorts are confined to the coast and the beaches. Conveniently all transport goes via sea routes. , local residents and visitors can take advantage of a well-functioning ferry network.

Extensive road clearings do foreshadow the island's future as a major tourist destination, yet as the developer's Chinese investment partner has dropped out of the team, funding remains uncertain. The Ministry of Tourism has expressed indirect discontent and is likely to cancel development licenses, if these important islands are left undeveloped.

In September 2012 the island was hooked up with the internet to Sihanoukville on the main land. The Royal Group dropped a fiber-glass cable in the gulf's waters—a distance of almost 30 kilometers. Still, none of the infrastructural projects are yet under way and according to The Phnom Penh Post: "plans are foggy".

Survivor
The island has also played host to the popular reality program Survivor. In 2012, Koh-Lanta, the French edition of the program, produced a special All-Star edition (titled  Koh-Lanta: Revenge of the Heroes) on Koh Rong, near Sok San village. Production returned to the island in 2013 for a regular edition (Koh-Lanta: Cambodia), but production ended abruptly after the death of a contestant. Koh-Lanta returned to the island in 2016 for another regular edition (Koh-Lanta: Island of Treasure).

More recently, the American edition of Survivor produced Season 31 (Survivor: Cambodia—Second Chance) and 32 (Survivor: Kaôh Rōng—Brains vs Brawn vs Beauty) of the program on Koh Rong over the course of four months between March and July 2015. The sixteenth edition of Expedition Robinson, Sweden's Survivor, was also filmed on Koh Rong.

Gallery

See also 

 Koh Rong Sanloem
 Koh Sdach
 Koh Thmei
 List of islands of Cambodia
 List of Cambodian inland islands
 Sihanoukville

References

External links

 Independent Travel Guide on Koh Rong Island
 Koh Rong Island Tourism
 Cambodia Island Database-list of islands

Islands of Cambodia
Islands of the Gulf of Thailand
Populated places in Sihanoukville province
Sihanoukville (city)